Indian Cave Petroglyphs may refer to:

Indian Cave Petroglyphs (Tennessee), listed on the National Register of Historic Places near Onward in White County, Tennessee
Indian Cave Petroglyphs (West Virginia), listed on the National Register of Historic Places in Harrison County, West Virginia